Qiwllaqucha (Quechua qillwa, qiwlla, qiwiña gull, qucha lake, "gull lake", hispanicized spelling Quiullacocha) is a lake in Peru located in the Junín Region, Chupaca Province, Yanacancha District.

References 

Lakes of Peru
Lakes of Junín Region